Providence is an unincorporated community in Granville County, North Carolina, United States.

References

Unincorporated communities in Granville County, North Carolina
Unincorporated communities in North Carolina